Oscar and Lucinda is a novel by Australian author Peter Carey which won the 1988 Booker Prize and the 1989 Miles Franklin Award. It was shortlisted for The Best of the Booker.

Plot introduction
The book tells the story of Oscar Hopkins, the Devonian son of a Plymouth Brethren minister who becomes an Anglican priest, and Lucinda Leplastrier, a young Australian heiress who buys a glass factory. They meet on the ship over to Australia, and discover that they are both gamblers, one obsessive, the other compulsive. Lucinda bets Oscar that he cannot transport a glass church from Sydney to a remote settlement at Bellingen, some 400 km up the New South Wales coast. This bet changes both their lives forever.

Inspiration
The novel partly takes its inspiration from Father and Son, the autobiography of the English poet Edmund Gosse, which describes his relationship with his father, Philip Henry Gosse.

Film

A film version released in 1997 was directed by Gillian Armstrong and starred Ralph Fiennes, Cate Blanchett, and Tom Wilkinson.

References

External links
 Peter Carey discusses Oscar and Lucinda on the BBC World Book Club
Oscar and Lucinda at the National Film and Sound Archive
Oscar and Lucinda at IMDB
 

Booker Prize-winning works
1988 Australian novels
Novels by Peter Carey (novelist)
Miles Franklin Award-winning works
Novels set in New South Wales
University of Queensland Press books
Australian novels adapted into films
Fiction set in the 1830s
Fiction set in the 1840s
Fiction set in the 1850s
Fiction set in the 1860s